Davide Zannoni (born 1958 in Spoleto, Italy) is a composer of contemporary Classical music. He began his career playing drums in jazz clubs and later symphonic percussion with the Maggio Musicale Fiorentino Orchestra in Florence, Italy. He also pursued academic studies and earned a doctoral degree in Humanities from the University of Bologna, while studying composition privately in Florence. After moving to New York, he received a master's degree in Music from Queens College.

He has received commissions and grants from many organizations and performers both in Italy and the U.S., and his catalog includes works for orchestra, choir, and chamber ensembles. A significant portion of his output is devoted to music for percussion. His works have been recorded on several CD’s.

His idiosyncratic and hard to categorize compositional language includes elements from different musical traditions, in an alternation and often superimposition of harsh dissonance and lyricism.

Discography
The Color Duo "Hemisphaeria" ("Simmetrie di Paradiso") 2018
The Emerald Trio ("Passions of the Present"), NAXOS 2017
Piano Duo Five O'Clock "Italian Connection", Amroc label
Tetraktis Percussione "Drama" 2008 
Nicola Mazzanti "The Crazy Acrobat"Not On Label – CDNM002 
Greg Giannascoli "Hammer" 2005, WMM3 
Guido Arbonelli "Namaste Suite" 2003 Mnemes label 
Ivano Ascari "Nuove Musiche per Tromba, vol. 8" Sonica studios AZ3697 
Ivano Ascari "Nuove Musiche per Tromba, vol. 5" Sonica studios
Ivano Ascari "Nuove Musiche per Tromba, vol. 3" Sonica studios AZ2112
"Christmas with The Manhattan Choral Ensemble" 
"Links" (Partita per un Percussionista) - Federico Poli
Jikkai

References

the composer's website

External links
 Official site
 Intervista Assoc. Culturale Colli Ionci http://www.associazionecolleionci.eu/?p=8479&lang=it
 Scores - http://musicalics.com/en/composer/Davide-Zannoni
 Review of the Pressioni del Passato - http://www.instantencore.com/buzz/item.aspx?FeedEntryId=170542
Emerald Trio, "Le Pressioni del Passato"
Jade String Trio "Glimmers of Acceptance"
Renaissance Saxophone Ensemble "Making the Frozen Serpent Dance"
Duo Moderne "Tre Canti di Vita"

1958 births
Italian composers
Italian male composers
Living people
People from Spoleto